The word geek is a slang term originally used to describe eccentric or non-mainstream people; in current use, the word typically connotes an expert or enthusiast obsessed with a hobby or intellectual pursuit. In the past, it had a generally pejorative meaning of a "peculiar person, especially one who is perceived to be overly intellectual, unfashionable, boring, or socially awkward". In the 21st century, it was reclaimed and used by many people, especially members of some fandoms, as a positive term.

Some use the term self-referentially without malice or as a source of pride, often referring simply to "someone who is interested in a subject (usually intellectual or complex) for its own sake".

Etymology
The word comes from English dialect geek or geck (meaning a "fool" or "freak"; from Middle Low German Geck). Geck is a standard term in modern German and means "fool" or "fop". The root also survives in the Dutch and Afrikaans adjective gek ("crazy"), as well as some German dialects, like the Alsatian word Gickeleshut ("jester's hat"; used during carnival). In 18th century Austria, Gecken were freaks on display in some circuses. In 19th century North America, the term geek referred to a performer in a geek show in a circus, traveling carnival or travelling funfair sideshows (see also freak show). The 1976 edition of the American Heritage Dictionary included only the definition regarding geek shows. 

This variation of the term was used to comic effect in 1970s TV shows such as Sanford & Son, and Starsky and Hutch. In the Bounty Hunter episode of 1976 of Starsky and Hutch, stating that "a geek is a freak in a circus side show, who is kept in a pit and they throw snakes and chicken heads at, and he runs around crazy and gobbles them up", and "in 1932 the geeks formed their own union".

Professional wrestling manager "Classy" Freddie Blassie recorded a song in the 1970s called "Pencil-Necked Geek".

Definitions
The 1975 edition of the American Heritage Dictionary, published a decade before the Digital Revolution, gave only one definition: "Geek [noun, slang]. A carnival performer whose act usually consists of biting the head off a live chicken or snake." The tech revolution found new uses for this word, but it still often conveys a derogatory sting. In 2017, Dictionary.com gave five definitions, the fourth of which is "a carnival performer who performs sensationally morbid or disgusting acts, as biting off the head of a live chicken."

The term nerd has a similar, practically synonymous meaning as geek, but many choose to identify different connotations among these two terms, although the differences are disputed. In a 2007 interview on The Colbert Report, Richard Clarke said the difference between nerds and geeks is "geeks get it done" or "ggid". Julie Smith defined a geek as "a bright young man turned inward, poorly socialized, who felt so little kinship with his own planet that he routinely traveled to the ones invented by his favorite authors, who thought of that secret, dreamy place his computer took him to as cyberspace—somewhere exciting, a place more real than his own life, a land he could conquer, not a drab teenager's room in his parents' house."

Impact

Technologically oriented geeks, in particular, now exert a powerful influence over the global economy and society. Whereas previous generations of geeks tended to operate in research departments, laboratories and support functions, now they increasingly occupy senior corporate positions, and wield considerable commercial and political influence. When U.S. President Barack Obama met with Facebook's Mark Zuckerberg and the CEOs of the world's largest technology firms at a private dinner in Woodside, California on February 17, 2011, New York magazine ran a story titled "The world's most powerful man meets President Obama". At the time, Zuckerberg's company had grown to over one billion users.

According to Mark Roeder the rise of the geek represents a new phase of human evolution. In his book, Unnatural Selection: Why The Geeks Will Inherit The Earth he suggests that "the high-tech environment of the Anthropocene favours people with geek-like traits, many of whom are on the autism spectrum, ADHD, or dyslexia. Previously, such people may have been at a disadvantage, but now their unique cognitive traits enable some of them to resonate with the new technological zeitgeist and become very successful."

The Economist magazine observed, on June 2, 2012, "Those square pegs (geeks) may not have an easy time in school. They may be mocked by jocks and ignored at parties. But these days no serious organisation can prosper without them."

Fashion

"Geek chic" refers to a minor fashion trend that arose in the mid 2000s  (decade), in which young people adopted "geeky" fashions, such as oversized black horn-rimmed glasses, suspenders/braces, and capri pants. The glasses quickly became the defining aspect of the trend, with the media identifying various celebrities as "trying geek" or "going geek" for wearing such glasses, such as David Beckham and Justin Timberlake. Meanwhile, in the sports world, many NBA players wore "geek glasses" during post-game interviews, drawing comparisons to Steve Urkel.

The term "geek chic" was appropriated by some self-identified "geeks" to refer to a new, socially acceptable role in a technologically advanced society.

See also

Akiba-kei and Otaku, Japanese slang
Anorak and boffin, British slang
Dweeb
Furry
Gamer
Gamer girl
Geek Code
Geek girl
Geek Pride Day
Geekcorps
Girl Geek Dinners
Greaser
Internet culture
Jock
Neckbeard (slang)
Nerd
Preppy
Reappropriation
Video game culture

References

Further reading

External links

 Geek Culture: The Third Counter-Culture, an article discussing geek culture as a new kind of counter-culture.
 The Origins of Geek Culture: Perspectives on a Parallel Intellectual Milieu, an article about geek culture seen in a cultural historical perspective.
 Hoevel, Ann. "Are you a nerd or a geek?" CNN. December 2, 2010.
 "Geek Chic", USA Today, October 22, 2003
 "How Geek Chic Works"

2000s fashion
2010s fashion
2020s fashion
2000s slang
2010s slang
Computing culture
English-language slang
Fashion aesthetics
History of subcultures
Internet culture
Nerd culture
Epithets related to nerd culture
Stereotypes